The 2009–10 Serie B season is the seventy-eighth edition since its establishment in 1929.  Serie B is the second-highest division in the Italian football league system after the Serie A. It is contested by 22 teams and organized by the Lega Calcio.

A total of 22 teams contest the league, 15 of which returned from the 2008–09 season, four of which have been promoted from Lega Pro Prima Divisione, and three relegated from Serie A.

Teams

Stadiums and locations

Personnel and kits

Managerial changes

Before the start of the season

During the season

 Giuseppe Giannini left Gallipoli by mutual consent in June 2009, only three weeks after having won promotion to Serie B with the club, due to uncertainty regarding the club future. He successively agreed to return at Gallipoli two months later, and only ten days before the season kick-off, after Udine-based D'Odorico Group completed the club takeover. During the time Giannini did not act as head coach, no replacement was appointed.
 Salernitana under-19 coach Gianluca Grassadonia was appointed to replace Marco Cari in November 2009 despite not having the required coaching badges. In December, Ersilio Cerone was appointed "official" head coach to fulfil the requirement for a UEFA A coaching graduate, with Grassadonia appearing as assistant but being usually referred as the "real" manager. Grassadonia was later announced to have been removed from the first team coaching staff on March 14, 2010, whereas Cerone was confirmed as head coach, this time on a real basis.

The list does not include Giuseppe Giannini's resignation from Gallipoli, who were announced on February 8, 2010 and withdrawn two days later following a meeting with club chairman Daniele D'Odorico.

Events
The 2009–10 Serie B season will feature the return of seven-times Italian champions Torino, who were relegated from Serie A. Other teams relegated from the top flight include Reggina (after seven consecutive seasons in the Serie A) and Lecce (after only one season in the highest tier).

Four teams were promoted from Lega Pro Prima Divisione: Cesena, Crotone, Padova and newcomers Gallipoli. As of 10 August, Gallipoli did not manage to organize a squad for the league and were even without a head coach due to club issues (the club chairman being in talks with several third parties regarding a possible takeover); this also forced the club to play the Under-19 team for the second round of the Coppa Italia tournament, lost 6–1 to lower league outfit Lumezzane. The following day, Giuseppe Giannini returned to coach Gallipoli after a company from Udine took over the club.

On 23 September 2009, the Football League committee point deductions of respectively two and one points for clubs Crotone and Gallipoli due to administrative and financial breaches. The one point deduction for Gallipoli was later canceled by the Federal Court of Justice on October 22, with the two-point penalty regarding Crotone being instead confirmed.

An analogous one-point penalty involving Ancona was ratified by the National Disciplinary Committee on 18 February 2010 due to not having paid a number of salaries in June and July 2009; such deduction was extended to two points by the Federal Court of Justice later on 12 March.

The season also experienced a suspension for the 3 March match between Cesena and Sassuolo, which was not completed due to heavy snow at the 73rd minute, with the result being 0–0. As per Italian league rules, only the remaining 17 minutes were played, and an unusual mini-game was therefore rescheduled on 16 March during which Sassuolo managed to score a goal (at the second minute of the match replay) to record a 1–0 win.

Later, on 19 March, Salernitana were docked six points due to matchfixing regarding a Serie C1 league game held in April 2008 against Potenza. Salernitana were also the first team to get mathematically relegated, after a 5–2 loss to Empoli left the Campanian club with a 23-point gap between them and 19th-placed Padova with seven games to the end of the season.

League table

Results

Play-off

Promotion
Semi-finals
First legs played 2 June 2010; return legs played 6 June 2010

In case of an aggregate tie, the higher seed advances.

Finals
First leg played 9 June 2010; return leg played 13 June 2010

Brescia promoted to Serie A.

Relegation
First leg played 4 June 2010; return leg played 12 June 2010

Top goalscorers
Updated as of May 23, 2010

 26 goals
  Éder (Empoli)
 24 goals
  Mirko Antenucci (Ascoli)
  Rolando Bianchi (Torino)
  Mauricio Pinilla (Grosseto)
 23 goals
  Andrea Caracciolo (Brescia)
 22 goals
  Matteo Ardemagni (Cittadella)
  Salvatore Mastronunzio (Ancona)
 18 goals
  Alessandro Noselli (Sassuolo)
 17 goals
  Daniele Corvia (Lecce)
 16 goals
  Claudio Coralli (Empoli)

References

Serie B seasons
2009–10 in Italian football leagues
Italy